Election in Christianity involves God choosing a particular person or group of people to a particular task or relationship, especially eternal life.

Election to eternal life is viewed by some as conditional on a person's faith, and by others as unconditional.

In the Old Testament

The Old Testament applies the term "elect" (Gk: ἐκλεκτος, Hebrew: בָּחִיר) to the Israelites in as far as they are called to be the chosen people, or people of God, or are faithful to their divine call. The idea of such an election is common in Deuteronomy and in Isaiah 40-66.

In the New Testament
The New Testament transfers the meaning of the term from its connection with the people of Israel to the members of the body of Christ (Christian church), either militant on earth or triumphant in heaven.

Based on the statements of Jesus Christ that one should, "enter in at the narrow gate, for wide is the gate, and broad is the way, that leads to destruction, and many there are that go in thereat. How narrow is the gate and strait the way that leads to life, and few there are that find it," (Matt. 7:13,14) and that ".. many are called, but few chosen." (Mark 20:16) many have inferred that there are very few elect, who are saved. However the number of the elect is generally an open question with no conclusive answer, as evidenced by the fact that there is no Catholic dogma concerning the matter.

See also

Predestination
Corporate election

References

 LESÊTRE in Dict. de la Bible (Paris, 1899), II, 1708 sqq.; MURRAY, Dict. of the Bible (New York, 1900), I, 678 sqq.; KNABENBAUER, Evang. secundum Matthæum (Paris, 1893), II, 178, 247; MONSABRÉ Conférences de Notre-Dame (1899), Conference VI.

Christian soteriology
Christian terminology